William David McKenzie, Baron McKenzie of Luton (24 July 1946 – 2 December 2021) was a British Labour politician. Until the 2010 general election, he was Parliamentary Under-Secretary of State at the Department for Work and Pensions and the Department for Communities and Local Government. He was also a partner at accounting firm Price Waterhouse.

Education and early career
Born in Reading in 1946, son of Donald McKenzie and wife Elsa "Elsie" May Doust, McKenzie was educated at the University of Bristol between 1964 and 1967, graduating with a BA degree in Economics and Accounting. In 1967, he began his accountancy career at Martin Rata and Partners as an articled clerk and went on to qualify as a professional accountant. He moved to Price Waterhouse in 1973, working for a senior manager in many locations. In 1980, he was promoted to a partner, holding this position until 1986, when he became a consultant. He stayed within the company, but in 1992, he moved to Hong Kong, working first as a consultant, and then as a partner again. He acted as partner-in-charge for Price Waterhouse Vietnam from 1996 to 1998.

Early political career
McKenzie twice contested the seat of Luton South in the 1987 and 1992 general elections respectively. However, both attempts were unsuccessful.

He was an elected member of Luton Borough Council from 1976 to 1992, then again from 1999 to 2005, following a spell in the far east. He served as its leader until May 2003 and remained on the Council until 2005. He covered a number of roles during his Council service, particularly relating to local government finance. During this time, he was a member of the GMB trade union, serving a range of trades from clerical work to furniture manufacturers. Lord McKenzie remained a member of GMB. He was also Chairman of London Luton Airport.

Later political career
McKenzie was elevated to the peerage on 18 June 2004 as Baron McKenzie of Luton, of Luton, in the County of Bedfordshire. He was appointed Government Spokesperson in the House of Lords Treasury and a Whip for the Department of Trade and Industry in May 2005. Before being awarded a peerage, Lord McKenzie had been an advisor to Labour's Shadow Treasury team and a member of the original Fabian Society Taxation Review Committee. McKenzie served as a Lord in Waiting and Government Spokesperson in the House of Lords for Treasury and Industry issues from 2005 to 2007. He was appointed Parliamentary Under-Secretary of State at the Department for Work and Pensions on 8 January 2007 and among his ministerial responsibilities were health and safety at work and the Health and Safety Executive. In the June 2009 reshuffle he retained this role, in addition to becoming a minister at the Department for Communities and Local Government.

After the 2010 General Election, Lord McKenzie shadowed his former roles in the House of Lords, as opposition spokesman on both Work and Pensions, and Communities and Local Government. He remained in this position after the election of Ed Miliband as Labour Party leader.

Personal life
McKenzie married Diana Joyce Angliss in 1972. She became Lady McKenzie of Luton when her husband was elevated to the peerage in 2004.

He died on 2 December 2021, at the age of 75.

References

External links
 

1946 births
2021 deaths
Labour Party (UK) life peers
Alumni of the University of Bristol
Labour Party (UK) parliamentary candidates
Councillors in Bedfordshire
Labour Party (UK) councillors
Leaders of local authorities of England
Labour Party (UK) Baronesses- and Lords-in-Waiting
English accountants
PricewaterhouseCoopers people
Life peers created by Elizabeth II